The Happiest Girl in the World is a 2009 Romanian film by Radu Jude. It is a part of the Romanian New Wave.

Plot
Delia comes to Bucharest with her parents to collect a prize, a car, she has won in a contest organized by a soft-drinks company. All Delia has to do is appear in a commercial. All goes well until it becomes clear that Delia and her parents have different intentions for the new car. Meanwhile, the sponsor needs a radiant prize-winner with a gleaming smile.

See also
 Romanian New Wave

External links
 
 

2009 films
Romanian comedy-drama films
Films directed by Radu Jude